Milajerd Rural District is a rural district (dehestan) in Milajerd District, Komijan County, Markazi Province, Iran. At the 2006 census, its population was 3,221, in 770 families. The rural district has 9 villages.

References 

Rural Districts of Markazi Province
Komijan County